Lapajne is a Slovenian language surname.  Notable people with this surname include:

Beno Lapajne, Slovenian  handball player
Janez Lapajne, Slovenian film director, producer, writer, editor and production designer
Lidija Benedetič-Lapajne, Slovenian athlete
Sonja Lapajne-Oblak, Slovenian architect, civil engineer and Slovenia's first female urban planner. Partisan fighter during the Second World War, survived incarceration in Ravensbruck concentration camp.

References

Slovene-language surnames